Kohneh or Kahneh may refer to:
 Kahneh, Bushehr
 Kohneh, Larestan, Fars Province
 Kahneh, Evaz, Larestan County, Fars Province
 Kohneh-ye Jadid, Larestan County, Fars Province
 Kohneh, Hormozgan
 Kohneh, Razavi Khorasan